Colubrina greggii, commonly known as Sierra nakedwood or Gregg's colubrina, is a species of flowering plant in the family Rhamnaceae native to eastern Mexico, with a disjunct population in southern Texas in the United States.

Etymology 
The name honours American botanist Josiah Gregg (1806 – 1850), who collected the holotype near Monterrey, Nuevo León in 1848.

Description
Colubrina greggii is a shrub 2–3 m in height or a small tree, reaching 5 m. Stems zigzag and are glabrate to loosely sericeous. Leaves are alternately arranged, simple, ovate to lanceolate-ovate or elliptic-ovate, and have finely toothed margins. The blades measure 6–18 cm in length and 3–8 cm in width. Petioles are 4–20 mm long. The inflorescence is a thyrse with 20-80 flowers. Peduncles measure 5–12 mm in length. The flowers are greenish-yellow, with stamens opposite the spoon-shaped petals. Flowering takes place in the spring or summer through fall. Fruiting pedicels are 5–10 mm in length. The fruit is a hard, globose capsule approximately 8–10 mm in diameter, on which calyx remnants form an equatorial ring.  It is very similar to C. arborescens of southern Florida and the Caribbean, and herbarium specimens of the two species are difficult to distinguish.

Habitat and range
C. greggii can be found in the states of Coahuila, Guanajuato, Hidalgo, Nuevo León, Queretaro, San Luis Potosi, Tamaulipas, and Veracruz in Mexico.

Systematics
Colubrina greggii is part of a species complex with C. angustior of San Luis Potosi, southern Tamaulipas, and northern Veracruz and C. yucatanensis of Campeche, Quintana Roo, Yucatán, and Guatemala's Petén Department. The latter two species were considered varieties of C. greggii until they were raised to full species in 2013.

References

External links
Colubrina greggii @ iNaturalist
Colubrina greggii @ EncicloVida

greggii
Plants described in 1882
Trees of Guanajuato
Trees of Hidalgo (state)
Trees of Northeastern Mexico
Flora of the Rio Grande valleys